Chhaju Ram College of Education, Hisar is a college located on Delhi road in Hisar in the Indian state of Haryana.

History
This privately funded and not-for-profit trust run institute has its origins in the philanthropic legacy of the prominent Jat businessman Seth Chhaju Ram (1881-1945) who made fortune in Colcatta during the British Raj. The college is run by the non-profit Jat Educational Institutions society, which also runs 
CRM JAT College, Chhaju Ram Law College, Hisar, Chhaju Ram Jat Senior Secondary School, Hisar and Chhaju Ram Public School, Hisar.

Academics
The college offer BEd degree examination of the Kurukshetra University.

See also 
 List of Universities and Colleges in Hisar
 List of schools in Hisar
 List of institutions of higher education in Haryana

References

External links 
 

Universities and colleges in Hisar (city)
Colleges of education in India